The Federation Against Copyright Theft (FACT) is an organisation established in 1983 to protect and represent the interests of its members' intellectual property (IP). FACT also investigates fraud and cybercrime, and provides global due diligence services to support citizenship investment and trade, business, financial and legal compliance.

FACT investigates and takes action against illegal content providers, and provides information about the risks of engaging with piracy and illegal content. FACT's partnership with Crimestoppers UK allows for the reporting of crime and illegal activity anonymously.

Members
FACT protects the intellectual property rights of global organisations including Premier League, BT Sport, Virgin Media and Sky.

Court cases

Surfthechannel.com
In June 2009, FACT brought criminal prosecution against the company Scopelight and its founder, Anton Vickerman, for running a pirate video search engine called Surfthechannel.com, which had a substantial user base and was a highly profitable illegal business. FACT commenced a private criminal prosecution, which required access to all the evidence in the custody of the police. Action taken by Scopelight's owners to prevent the evidence being given to FACT was rejected at the Court of Appeal (Scopelight & Ors v Chief Constable of Northumbria Police & Federation Against Copyright Theft [2009] EWCA Civ 1156) where the Court judgment made clear the legality of providing evidence to support a private prosecution.

Vickerman was charged with two counts of Conspiracy to Defraud and a criminal trial took place at Newcastle Crown Court in June and July 2012 in front of His Honour Judge Evans.

After a seven-week trial, the jury found Anton Vickerman guilty and he was sentenced to four years' imprisonment on each charge of Conspiracy to Defraud, sentencing to run concurrently.

Subsequently, Vickerman was ordered to pay £73,055.79 within six months or face a further prison sentence under proceeds of crime legislation.

Newzbin
In 2011 access to the Usenet indexing website Newzbin was blocked by BT and Sky following legal action in the UK by Hollywood film studios. FACT provided the evidence for this case which resulted in the eventual closure of the site in 2012.

freelivefooty
FACT conducted an investigation into the freelivefooty site and supplied evidence to Thames Valley Police who arrested the principal Gary. The site illegally streamed Premier League matches and charged viewers a price that undercut the official broadcaster, Sky. Gary used a satellite dish, seven computers and nine satellite decoders to run the freelivefooty website from his home.

He was prosecuted by the Crown Prosecution Service in 2013 and, on conviction, he received a six-month prison sentence suspended for two years and was ordered to carry out 200 hours of unpaid work. He was found guilty of one count of communicating a copyrighted work to the public in the course of a business contrary to S.107 of the Copyright, Designs and Patents Act 1988. An accomplice, Bannister, was ordered to carry out 140 hours of unpaid work after he was found guilty of transferring criminal property contrary to S.327(1)(d) of the Proceeds of Crime Act 2002.

FACT described this case as "groundbreaking, proving conclusively that operating a website that rebroadcasts copyrighted works without permission is a criminal offence".

NZBsRus
In June 2013, FACT pressured the Usenet file indexing site called NZBsRus to close after issuing cease-and-desist letters to the owner and several staff members.

TheCod3r
In May 2013, Philip Danks attended the Showcase cinema in Walsall and used a camcorder to record Fast and Furious 6 on the day of its release. Danks uploaded this copy online and the film was subsequently downloaded more than 700,000 times, causing significant revenue loss to Universal Pictures. FACT identified Danks by linking him to the online name of the uploader, which was TheCod3r. Five days after the recording was made Danks was arrested by West Midlands Police. Wolverhampton Crown Court heard that despite his arrest Danks continued to copy, sell and distribute illegal copies of films. He also enlisted the help of his sister's ex-boyfriend, Michael Bell, who uploaded films on his behalf.

Both men pleaded guilty to charges of committing offences under the Fraud Act 2006 and the Copyright, Designs and Patents Act 1988. Danks was sentenced to 33 months' imprisonment. Bell received a 12-month Community Order with 120 hours unpaid work.

Paul Mahoney
In 2014 FACT and the Police Service of Northern Ireland led an investigation into Paul Mahoney who ran a website from his bedroom which enabled visitors to find streaming links to films hosted on third party websites. Mahoney generated money by charging for advertising on his website. 
Mahoney pleaded guilty to two charges of conspiracy to defraud, one of acquiring criminal property and one of converting criminal property. He was sentenced to four years' imprisonment.

Release groups
In 2015 FACT undertook an investigation that led to the first prosecution of a 'release group'. Five suspects distributed illegally recorded copies of films online while they were still being shown in cinemas.

The five, who went under several online aliases including 'memory100', 'Cheese', 'Reidy', 'Cooperman' and 'Kareemzos', all pleaded guilty to conspiracy to defraud and were sentenced to a total of 17 years' imprisonment.

First sentencing in IPTV boxes case in England
In 2016 a FACT-supported investigation led to the first criminal case involving a supplier of illegal IPTV boxes enabling viewers to watch unauthorised content. Terry O'Reilly and Will O'Leary were selling devices to pubs and consumers which facilitated mass piracy, including the broadcasting of Premier League football on unauthorised channels.

Both defendants were convicted of conspiracy to defraud. O'Reilly was sentenced to four years' imprisonment. O'Leary received a two-year suspended sentence.

First 'card sharing' conviction in Scotland
In 2017 Gavin Gray pleaded guilty to four charges of fraud and offences under the Copyright, Designs and Patents Act 1988, following a multi-agency operation involving FACT. Gray illegally sold old decryption codes for premium Sky TV channels, including Sky Sports and Sky Movies.

Gray was the first person to be convicted of card-sharing in Scotland. He was given a 12-month Restriction of Liberty Order, a Community Payback Order and was told to complete 300 hours of unpaid work. He also received a confiscation order for £128,670.

Fake DVD sellers jailed
Following an investigation by Suffolk Police and FACT in 2017, three men were jailed for a total of 10 years and seven months. Frankie Ansell, his cousin Lee Ansell, Howard Davey and Joseph Plant managed a sophisticated counterfeit DVD business over a two-and-a-half-year period, selling over 31,000 DVDs worth more than £500,000.

Frankie Ansell was sentenced to 45 months' imprisonment, Lee Ansell and Davey were both sentenced to 41 months’ imprisonment. Plant received a 16-month sentence suspended for two years and was ordered to complete 200 hours of unpaid work.

Evolution Trading
A married couple illegally made £750,000 by selling more than 8,000 illicit streaming devices and running a service that provided illegal access to Premier League football. 
In 2018, following a FACT-assisted case the owner of the company Evolution Trading, Jon Haggerty, pleaded guilty to conspiracy to defraud and dishonestly obtaining services for another. Haggerty was sentenced to five years and three months' imprisonment. His wife, Mary Gilfillan, was convicted of fraud offences and given a two-year suspended sentence.

Dreambox
Three men provided illegal access to Premier League football to more than 1,000 pubs, clubs and homes throughout England and Wales and used a range of technologies to commit fraud over the course of a decade. Trading under the names Dreambox (unincorporated), Dreambox TV Limited and Digital Switchover Limited, the fraudulent companies earned in excess of £5m through illegal activity.

Following a FACT-assisted Premier League investigation, this case saw some of the longest sentences ever issued for piracy-related crimes. In 2019 Steven King, who masterminded the fraud, was sentenced to seven years and four months' imprisonment. Paul Rolston was sentenced to six years and four months’ imprisonment and Daniel Malone was sentenced to three years and three months' imprisonment.

Bovingdon Market
As part of ongoing investigations at Bovingdon Market by Hertfordshire Trading Standards in 2020, supported by FACT, two men were found guilty of encouraging consumers to obtain services dishonestly, contrary to the Serious Crime Act 2007 and the Fraud Act 2006. The jury also found Thomas Tewelde and Mohamed Abdou guilty of failing in their duty of care to ensure that the boxes were electrically safe.

Tewelde and Abdou were each sentenced to 12 months' imprisonment suspended for two years and were ordered to pay £1,000 in costs and complete 120 hours of unpaid work.

Former police officer jailed
Daniel Aimson was a police officer previously jailed in 2017 for bulk sale cannabis production. A joint operation between Greater Manchester Police and FACT found that a company managed by Aimson sold IPTV devices between September 2016 and May 2017 that allowed customers to bypass paywalls and access subscription sport and film channels for free.

In 2020 Aimson admitted conspiracy to commit fraud and was sentenced to twelve months' imprisonment.

Software developer jailed 
In 2021, in the first conviction of its type in the UK, a man who created and built a software package which enabled illegal access to BT Sport, Sky, Netflix and other subscription television content via apps and add-ons for the Kodi media player was sentenced to two and a half years’ imprisonment. Supported by BT Sport and Greater Manchester Police, FACT brought a private prosecution against Stephen Millington, who pleaded guilty to multiple fraud and copyright offences, including making and supplying software to enable illegal access to subscription content, distributing infringing film content via a dedicated server he controlled, sharing login credentials for subscription streaming services and illegally accessing content for his own use.

Anti-piracy warnings

FACT has produced several adverts which have appeared at the beginning of videos and DVDs released in the UK, as well as trailers shown before films in cinemas.

1980s 
Shortly after the founding of the company, FACT (along with sponsorship from Fuji Video Cassettes and Rank Film Laboratories) made a PIF discussing about video piracy and the causes of it. The PIF itself would show pictures of pirated tapes, posters for films released at the time including, E.T. the Extra-Terrestrial, Octopussy, Return of the Jedi and Gandhi, as well as pictures of filmmaking and a cinema disappearing through a transition effect to symbolise the death of the film industry. It then discusses the consequences of video piracy publicly released by the parliament; 2 years of prison and unlimited fines, along with a picture of a bargain of legal video tapes disappearing through another transition effect. The PIF ends with the same FACT logo shown at the beginning along with a phone number used at the time. This PIF would be shown in cinemas at the time as well as appearing at the end of various Palace Video rental releases.

1990s
During the 1990s, FACT created a 30-second to 1-minute anti-piracy warning called "Beware of Illegal Video Cassettes", reminding customers to check whether they have a genuine video and how to report questionable copies. They appeared on many different video cassettes by various home video companies. Versions for each studio depicting their respective security label (generally a hologram of the studio logo or a Disney film logo) were created, with several iterations for each as the FACT hotline number changed multiple times throughout the decade with the message "Video Piracy Is a Crime, Do Not Accept It”. The warning was placed at the beginning of most rental VHS tapes in the UK (as well as many retail tapes), similar to the FBI Warning found on tapes in the United States. CIC Video and The Walt Disney Company had a similar term, with the hologram carrying CIC logo copies. From late 1996, this warning was followed by a public information film featuring a man attempting to return a pirate video purchased from a market after discovering that the sound was garbled and the picture unwatchable, ending with the tagline "Pirate Videos: Daylight Robbery”. The "Pirate Videos: Daylight Robbery" ad was used until 2002. A precursor PIF, "Video Piracy: It's Not Worth It!" was released in 1995 and featured a young girl named Rebecca trying to watch a pirated VHS tape on a TV, ending with a VHS player falling down with the words on top: "VIDEO PIRACY. It's not worth it”.

2000s
In 2002, FACT released a PIF called "The Pirates are Out to Get You". It featured a man destroying many items with an X-shaped branding iron, ending with the FACT logo and UK, Ireland, Australia & New Zealand hotlines. The warning was placed at the beginning of practically every rental VHS tape in the UK (as well as most retail tapes), similar to the FBI Warning found on tapes in the United States.

With the advent of DVD, FACT borrowed the Motion Picture Association of America's anti-piracy spot "You Wouldn't Steal a Car", which concentrated more on copyright infringement through peer-to-peer filesharing and less on counterfeit copies. The spot related the peer-to-peer filesharing of movies to stealing a handbag, a car, and other such items (similar to the US FAST "Piracy is theft" slogan of the 1990s).

More recent spots have included Knock-off Nigel, devised by the Industry Trust for Intellectual Property Awareness, where a man is ridiculed by his friends and colleagues for buying counterfeit DVDs and downloading films from BitTorrent, along with ads that say "Thank You" to the British public for supporting the film industry by either buying a ticket and seeing a film in the cinema or purchasing a genuine DVD or Blu-ray.

See also
 Conspiracy to defraud
 Copyfraud
 Copyleft
 Copyright
 Copyright alternatives
 Criticism of copyright
 Don't Copy That Floppy
 Fraud
 Home Recording Rights Coalition
 Home Taping Is Killing Music
 Internet freedom
 Knock-off Nigel
 Piracy is theft
 Public information film (PIF)
 Public service announcement
 Spin (public relations)
 Steal This Film
 Who Makes Movies?
 You can click, but you can't hide
 You Wouldn't Steal a Car

References

External links
 FACT homepage
 

Information technology organisations based in the United Kingdom
1983 establishments in the United Kingdom
Organizations established in 1983
Copyright enforcement companies
United Kingdom copyright law
Internet censorship in the United Kingdom
Articles containing video clips